Shaila Sharmin (born 16 July 1989) is a Bangladeshi cricketer who plays as a right-arm off break bowler and right-handed batter. She appeared in 9 One Day Internationals and 16 Twenty20 Internationals for Bangladesh between 2013 and 2019. She has played domestic cricket for Khulna Division and Sylhet Division in Bangladesh and Colts Cricket Club in Sri Lanka.

References

External links
 
 

1989 births
Living people
People from Khulna
Bangladeshi women cricketers
Bangladesh women One Day International cricketers
Bangladesh women Twenty20 International cricketers
Asian Games medalists in cricket
Cricketers at the 2014 Asian Games
Asian Games silver medalists for Bangladesh
Medalists at the 2014 Asian Games
Khulna Division women cricketers
Sylhet Division women cricketers
Colts Cricket Club women cricketers